Adam Brodzisz (18 February 1906 – 9 November 1986) was a Polish film actor. He appeared in 22 films between 1928 and 1955.

Selected filmography
 Exile to Siberia (1930)
The Citadel of Warsaw (1930)
 Bezimienni bohaterowie (1932)
 Sound of the Desert (1932)
 Młody Las (1934)
 Rapsodia Bałtyku (1935)
 Bohaterowie Sybiru (1936)
 Kobiety nad przepaścią (1938)

References

External links

1906 births
1986 deaths
Burials at Rakowicki Cemetery
Polish male film actors
Polish emigrants to the United States
Actors from Lviv
People from the Kingdom of Galicia and Lodomeria
20th-century Polish male actors